William Rashleigh (7 March 1867 – 13 February 1937) was an English cricketer who played first-class cricket for Kent County Cricket Club and Oxford University between 1885 and 1901. He was born at Farningham in Kent and died at Balcombe in Sussex.

Cricket career
Rashleigh was the son of farmer and cricketer William Boys Rashleigh. He played in the Tonbridge School XI from 1882 to 1885, and made his first-class debut for Kent on 24 August 1885.  He went up to Brasenose College, Oxford that autumn. he gained his blue as a freshman. In July 1886 he joined Kingsmill Key in a stand of 243, a record first-wicket partnership at that time in a Varsity Match; both batsmen hit centuries, but no other batsman in the innings reached double figures. Altogether in first-class cricket he passed one hundred in nine innings. The right-handed batsman's top score of 163 was made against Middlesex in June 1896.

Teaching and ecclesiastical career
After occupying posts at Uppingham School and Tonbridge as assistant master, Rashleigh took Holy Orders in 1892. He was a minor canon at Canterbury Cathedral between 1903 and 1912, rector of St George's, Canterbury from 1912 to 1916, and subsequently vicar of Horton Kirby and Ridgmont.

References

External links

Rashleigh's marriages and children

1867 births
1937 deaths
Schoolteachers from Kent
English cricketers
Kent cricketers
Oxford University cricketers
Oxford and Cambridge Universities cricketers
People educated at Tonbridge School
Alumni of Brasenose College, Oxford
20th-century English Anglican priests
Oxford University Past and Present cricketers
People from Farningham
People from Balcombe, West Sussex